Sicaya is a town in Central Peru, capital of the district Sicaya in the province Huancayo in the region Junín.

References

Populated places in the Junín Region